In mathematics, in particular functional analysis, the singular values, or s-numbers of a compact operator  acting between Hilbert spaces   and , are the square roots of the (necessarily non-negative) eigenvalues of the self-adjoint operator  (where  denotes the adjoint of ).

The singular values are non-negative real numbers, usually listed in decreasing order (σ1(T), σ2(T), …).  The largest singular value σ1(T) is equal to the operator norm of T (see Min-max theorem).

Therefore, 

Most norms on Hilbert space operators studied are defined using s-numbers.  For example, the Ky Fan-k-norm is the sum of first k singular values, the trace norm is the sum of all singular values, and the Schatten norm is the pth root of the sum of the pth powers of the singular values.  Note that each norm is defined only on a special class of operators, hence s-numbers are useful in classifying different operators.

This is the singular value decomposition.

Basic properties 

Min-max theorem for singular values.

Matrix transpose and conjugate do not alter singular values.

For any unitary 

Relation to eigenvalues:

Relation to trace:

.

Inequalities about singular values 
See also.

Singular values of sub-matrices

For 
 Let  denote  with one of its rows or columns deleted. Then 
 Let  denote  with one of its rows and columns deleted. Then 
Then

Singular values of A + B

For

Singular values of AB

For 
 
 

For

Singular values and eigenvalues

For .
 See 
 Assume . Then for :
 Weyl's theorem 
 For .

History 
This concept was introduced by Erhard Schmidt in 1907.  Schmidt called singular values "eigenvalues" at that time.  The name "singular value" was first quoted by Smithies in 1937.  In 1957, Allahverdiev proved the following characterization of the nth s-number: 
 

This formulation made it possible to extend the notion of s-numbers to operators in Banach space.

See also 
Condition number
Cauchy interlacing theorem or Poincaré separation theorem
Schur–Horn theorem
Singular value decomposition

References

Operator theory
Singular value decomposition